Cryptolechia gei is a moth in the family Depressariidae. It was described by Wang in 2003. It is found in the Chinese provinces of Sichuan and Guizhou.

References

Moths described in 2003
Cryptolechia (moth)